Ansonia longidigita (common names: long-fingered slender toad, long-fingered stream toad) is a species of toad in the family Bufonidae. It is endemic to northern and western Borneo in Sabah and Sarawak (Malaysia) and in Brunei.

Description
The specific name longidigita means "long-fingered" and refers to the long and slender fingers of the species. It has a slender habitus. The tympanum is distinct. Dorsal skin has numerous small, round warts.

They have dark blotches on cream background colour.

Habitat and conservation
Ansonia longidigita is a common toad inhabiting mid-elevation hills. Adults live on the forest floor or low in the vegetation. They breed in small, clear brooks and streams with rocky bottom. Males call from the stream boulders or from vegetation by the stream.

The species is threatened by habitat loss caused by logging, and the siltation of streams that logging leads to.

References

External links
 Sound recordings of Ansonia longidigita at BioAcoustica

longidigita
Endemic fauna of Borneo
Amphibians of Brunei
Amphibians of Malaysia
Amphibians described in 1960
Taxa named by Robert F. Inger
Taxonomy articles created by Polbot
Amphibians of Borneo
Fauna of the Borneo montane rain forests
Borneo lowland rain forests